Joshua Williams (born 2 February 1941) is a Ghanaian boxer. He competed in the men's featherweight event at the 1960 Summer Olympics. At the 1960 Summer Olympics, he lost to Constantin Gheorghiu of Romania.

References

External links
 

1941 births
Living people
Ghanaian male boxers
Olympic boxers of Ghana
Boxers at the 1960 Summer Olympics
Boxers from Accra
Featherweight boxers